MFC 31: Rundown was a mixed martial arts event held by the Maximum Fighting Championship (MFC) on October 7, 2011 at the Mayfield Inn Trade and Conference Centre in Edmonton, Alberta. The event was broadcast live on HDNet.

Background
Antonio McKee and Brian Cobb were expected to fight for the MFC Lightweight Championship on this card. However, that bout was moved to MFC 32.

This event used a half-point scoring system.

Results
Main Card:
MFC Light Heavyweight Championship bout:  Ryan Jimmo vs.  Rameau Thierry Sokoudjou
 Jimmo defeated Sokoudjou via unanimous decision (49–48, 49–48, 49–48).
Lightweight bout:  Kajan Johnson vs.  Richie Whitso]
 Johnson defeated Whitson via submission (rear naked choke) at 3:52 of round 1.
Lightweight bout:  Adam Lynn vs.  Curtis Demarce
Lynn defeated Demarce via KO (elbow) at 1:38 of round 1.
Lightweight bout:  Sabah Fadai vs.  Mukai Maromo
Maromo defeated Fadai via unanimous decision (30–27, 30–27, 30–27).
Middleweight bout:  Allen Hope vs.  Terry Martin
Martin defeated Hope via TKO (punches and elbows) at 2:13 of round 1.
Catchweight (175 lb.) bout:  Ryan Chiappe vs.  Cody Krahn
Krahn defeated Chiappe via submission (guillotine choke) at 3:45 of round 1.

Preliminary Card:
Catchweight (175 lb.) bout:  Mike Froese vs.  Dajan Kajic
Froese and Kajic ended in a No Contest at 0:31 of round 1 after Froese was poked in the eye.
Lightweight bout:  Garret Nybakken vs.  James Haddad
Haddad defeated Nybakken via submission (guillotine choke) at 4:12 of round 1.
Lightweight bout:  Neal Anderson vs.  Dan Ring
Ring defeated Anderson via unanimous decision.

References

31
2011 in mixed martial arts
Mixed martial arts in Canada
Sport in Edmonton
2011 in Canadian sports
October 2011 sports events in Canada